John Stuart "J. J." Mann (born June 12, 1991) is an American basketball player. He played college basketball for Belmont University.

College career
He played college basketball for the Belmont Bruins. As a senior during the 2013–14 season, Mann was named Ohio Valley Conference Player of the Year. He was also a First Team Academic All-American in 2013–14.

Professional career

Oberwart Gunners (2014-2015) 
Mann signed a pro deal to play with King Wilki Morskie Szczecin in Poland on July 24, 2014.  However, on August 25 he moved to the Oberwart Gunners in Austria without playing a game in Poland.

Phoenix Hagen (2015-2016) 
Mann joined Phoenix Hagen on August 13, 2015.

Okapi Aalstar (2019-2020) 
On June 12, 2019, Mann signed with Okapi Aalstar of the Belgian Pro Basketball League. and signed one year later with Bayer Giants Leverkusen

Bayer Giants Leverkusen (2020-present) 
In July 2020, Mann signed with Bayer Giants Leverkusen of the German ProA.

The Basketball Tournament
J.J. Mann played for Team Showtime in the 2018 edition of The Basketball Tournament. In two games, he averaged 4.5 points per game, 2.5 assists per game and 1.5 steals per game. Team Showtime reached the second round before falling to Louisiana United.

References

External links
Belmont profile

1991 births
Living people
American expatriate basketball people in Austria
American expatriate basketball people in Belgium
American expatriate basketball people in Denmark
American expatriate basketball people in Germany
American expatriate basketball people in Kosovo
American men's basketball players
Basketball players from Georgia (U.S. state)
Bayer Giants Leverkusen players
Belfius Mons-Hainaut players
Belmont Bruins men's basketball players
KB Prishtina players
Oberwart Gunners players
People from East Point, Georgia
Phoenix Hagen players
Small forwards
Sportspeople from DeKalb County, Georgia
Sportspeople from Fulton County, Georgia